"Green Light " - is a Soviet song written by Raimond Pauls and Nikolai Zinoviev. that was first released on Valery Leontiev album Dialogue in 1984.

Song In popular culture
Green Light was Soundtrack in popular Soviet animated series Nu, pogodi!, The Soundtrack was voiced  by Anatoli Papanov in 16 episode (1986).

Editions
 Album Dialogue (1984)
 Album  There, in September (1995) 
 Album Maple Leaf (2003)
 Album  Valery Leontiev. Lyme Vajkule: "Ah, Opening Day, ah (1993)
 Album Best songs 1 (Valery Leontiev) (1999) 
 Album Best songs 2 (Valery Leontiev) (1999)
 Album Golden Collection of Russia (Valery Leontiev) (2000)
 Album The BEST of Valery Leontiev (2001)

External links 
 Official website 
 Valery Leontiev performs Green Light

1984 songs
Valery Leontiev songs
Soviet songs